The Aoba Sho (Japanese 青葉賞) is a Japanese Grade 2 flat horse race in Japan for three-year-old Thoroughbreds. It is run over a distance of 2400 metres at Tokyo Racecourse in April.

The Aoba Sho was first run in 1984 and was elevated to Grade 3 status in 1994 before being promoted to Grade 2 in 2001. It serves as a trial race for the Tokyo Yushun.

Among the winners of the race have been Symboli Kris S, Zenno Rob Roy and Fenomeno.

Winners since 2000

Earlier winners

 1984 - Rush And Go
 1985 - Hamano Captain
 1986 - Sunny Light
 1987 - Chokai Fleet
 1988 - Gakuen To Beat
 1989 - Sir Pen Up
 1990 - Bigmouth
 1991 - Leo Durban
 1992 - Golden Zeus
 1993 - Stage Champ
 1994 - Air Dublin
 1995 - Summer Suspicion
 1996 - Mountain Stone
 1997 - Tokio Excellent
 1998 - Tayasu Again
 1999 - Painted Black

See also
 Horse racing in Japan
 List of Japanese flat horse races

References

Turf races in Japan